Polyrhachis convexa is a species of ant in the subfamily Formicinae, found in India, Sri Lanka, and China.

Subspecies
 Polyrhachis convexa convexa Roger, 1863    
 Polyrhachis convexa isabellae Forel, 1908

References

External links

 at antwiki.org
Animaldiversity.org
Itis.org

Formicinae
Hymenoptera of Asia
Insects described in 1863